Old Mans Head is a dark headland marking the south side of the entrance to Wüst Inlet, on the east coast of Palmer Land. It was discovered and photographed from the air in December 1940 by members of the United States Antarctic Service (USAS). During 1947 the headland was photographed from the air by the Ronne Antarctic Research Expedition (RARE), who in conjunction with the Falkland Islands Dependencies Survey (FIDS) charted it from the ground. This descriptive name was given by the FIDS.

References

Headlands of Palmer Land